Steel Spider (Oliver "Ollie" Osnick) is a superhero appearing in American comic books published by Marvel Comics.

Publication history
Ollie Osnick first appeared in The Spectacular Spider-Man #72 and was created by Bill Mantlo and Ed Hannigan. The character first appeared as Spider-Kid in The Amazing Spider-Man #263 and first appeared as Steel Spider in Spider-Man Unlimited #5.

Fictional character biography

Origin

Ollie Osnick is an overweight, gifted teenager who idolized Doctor Octopus. Using his genius, Ollie designs his own mechanical tentacles and calls himself Kid Ock. He influences a group of kids to dress up as super-villains, but they soon ran out on him. Ollie eventually runs away from home and breaks into a toy store.

There, he renders an elderly guard unconscious, although Ollie believes he has killed him. When Spider-Man arrives on the scene, he believes that it was actually Dr. Octopus at work, so he chases Ollie. Spider-Man realizes in time that it was not Ock he was facing. When Spider-Man and Ollie fall into a water tank, Spider-Man easily rips apart a tentacle, something that he was never able to do with Ock. Dragging Ollie to the surface, he learns it was actually Ollie he was chasing. By then the guard regains consciousness, and Spider-Man returns Ollie home safely.

Impressed with Spider-Man, Ollie modifies his tentacles into spider-legs and dons a Spider-Man Halloween costume, calling himself the Spider-Kid. Ollie's heroic activities often resulted in him having to be saved by Spider-Man. He was involved (along with Frog-Man and the Toad) in a short-lived super-hero team called The Misfits. Ollie was eventually convinced to hang up his costume and became a normal child.

However in his college years, Ollie had radically changed. He had devoted himself to exercise and became very athletic. Ollie still fantasized about being a hero, continuing to invent new weapons and modify his spider-legs. When his girlfriend was paralyzed by muggers, Ollie seeks revenge and creates the identity of "Steel Spider", donning a dark blue costume, and equipping himself with all of these new weapons (including gauntlets containing a grappling hook launcher and pepper spray blasters). Steel Spider locates and brutalizes his girlfriend's attackers. He removes his costume, realizing that he never wanted to be a vigilante and would rather build a life with the girl he loves.

When Onslaught attacks New York City, he is mentioned to be one of the heroes helping against the invading Sentinels, working with Darkhawk and the New Warriors to retake the Brooklyn Bridge.

Equipped with a new set of arms, Ollie Osnick now displays a more rebellious attitude towards the Superhero Registration Act following the "Civil War" storyline. As an unregistered superhero, Ollie becomes a target for the government's Thunderbolts team. Mention of his name also causes Thunderbolts director Norman Osborn to collapse into fits of laughter, as it reminds him of Spider-Man. After having beaten several drunken misfits, Ollie becomes afraid of the government sponsored Thunderbolts.

Ollie fights the Thunderbolts, and is joined in his battle by American Eagle and Sepulchre. After successfully defeating Venom, Radioactive Man and Swordsman, he uses the gadgetry in his metal limbs to square up against Radioactive Man, Songbird, Venom, and Penance, commenting that having allies "almost makes this a fair fight. I bet they weren't expecting that". As the fight continues, Ollie seems to be holding his own until Venom unexpectedly bites off and eats Ollie's left arm which later got Venom reprimanded by Osborn. Ollie is later shown being incarcerated in Prison 42 in the Negative Zone.

During the "Heroic Age" storyline following the defeat of Norman Osborn at the Siege of Asgard, Captain America researched Steel Spider and placed his incarceration under reconsideration.

Powers and abilities
Ollie Osnick has no superpowers but wears mechanical spider legs which allow him to climb. He also wears gauntlets that contain a grappling hook launcher and pepper spray blasters. He's also a gifted inventor with a genius-level intellect.

Other versions

MC2

In the MC2 continuity, Ollie Osnick never quits being Steel Spider and is even a member of the Avengers. He modifies his costume into a powerful exoskeleton and becomes a highly respected superhero. However, when his personal life fails and his wife leaves him, Steel Spider goes looking for criminals to take out his frustrations, but the crooks he finds are so afraid of him they surrender without a fight. Steel Spider has a tantrum, until he sees that he is being watched by Spider-Girl and American Dream. They tell him how much of an inspiration he had been to them, and he helps them defeat a terrorist cell called the Sons of the Serpent. After this, he sets about rebuilding his shattered personal life.

In other media

Television
 Ollie Osnick appears in the Ultimate Spider-Man episode "Spidah-Man!", voiced by Jason Marsden. This version is a teenage prodigy from Boston and a fan of Spider-Man who endorses his move to his hometown. After Spider-Man rejects the idea of him becoming his sidekick Webby, Ollie becomes upset and builds himself and three low-level criminals powered battle suits to become Steel Spider and the Boston Terroriers respectively. While fighting Spider-Man however, Ollie realizes the error of his ways, but fails to convince his accomplices, who seek to unmask Spider-Man for a reward that J. Jonah Jameson put out. Spider-Man and Ollie join forces to depower their suits before the former returns to New York while Ollie stays behind to become Boston's superhero.
 Steel Spider appears in Spider-Man, voiced by Josh Keaton. This version is a student at Osborn Academy who later becomes a member of the Osborn Commandos. Doctor Octopus brainwashes its members and Spider-Man to form the Sinister Six, but Harry Osborn / Hobgoblin frees Spider-Man, who frees the Osborn Commandos in turn.

Video games
Steel Spider appears as a playable character in Spider-Man Unlimited.

References

External links
 Steel Spider at Marvel Wiki

Characters created by Bill Mantlo
Marvel Comics superheroes
Marvel Comics 2
Marvel Comics scientists
Comics characters introduced in 1992
Fictional engineers
Fictional amputees
Fictional inventors
Spider-Man characters